Bruce Edward Kimm (born June 29, 1951) is an American former professional baseball catcher, manager and coach. He played all or part of four seasons in Major League Baseball for the Detroit Tigers, Chicago Cubs and Chicago White Sox between 1976 until 1980.

Born in Cedar Rapids, Iowa, Kimm grew up in nearby Norway and was a star player on the celebrated Norway High School baseball teams, all of which played in state championships during his high school days. He was a three-time all-state player in baseball and selected in the seventh round of the 1969 amateur draft by the White Sox, signing in his senior year of high school. Kimm made his major league debut in 1976 with the Detroit Tigers on May 4, where he was Mark Fidrych's personal catcher in 1976 and 1977. They had been teammates in 1975 at Triple-A Evansville and won the Junior World Series. He played his final major league game on September 19, 1980.

Managerial career 
Kimm began his managerial career in the Tigers organization in 1982. In 1995, he won Manager of the Year honors in the AA Southern League, compiling a 76–67 record with the Orlando Cubs en route to a playoff appearance. Kimm has also managed within the Cincinnati Reds organization. He managed in the minor leagues for five and a half seasons from 1982 to 2002, compiling a  record.

After the 2002 Chicago Cubs started the season with a  record, manager Don Baylor was fired and replaced on an interim basis by Kimm (though bench coach Rene Lachemann managed one game on July 5 prior to Kimm's arrival), who had been managing the Cubs' AAA affiliate. This caused some controversy, as former Tampa Bay Devil Rays manager and then Cubs pitching coach Larry Rothschild was seen by some as a better choice. Kimm did not fare much better than Baylor, as the Cubs went  for the rest of the season. His departure was announced before the final game of the season; he was replaced by Dusty Baker. In 2003, Kimm was a third base coach for Chicago's other MLB team, the White Sox.

Kimm has also been a coach for the Cincinnati Reds, Pittsburgh Pirates, San Diego Padres, Florida Marlins, Chicago White Sox, and Colorado Rockies.

External links

Bruce Kimm at SABR (Baseball BioProject)

1951 births
Living people
Appleton Foxes players
Baseball players from Iowa
Chicago Cubs managers
Chicago Cubs players
Chicago White Sox coaches
Chicago White Sox players
Cincinnati Reds coaches
Colorado Rockies (baseball) coaches
Detroit Tigers players
Duluth-Superior Dukes players
Evansville Triplets players
Florida Marlins coaches
Gulf Coast White Sox players
Iowa Cubs managers
Knoxville Sox players
Lakeland Flying Tigers managers
Major League Baseball catchers
Major League Baseball third base coaches
Montgomery Rebels players
Pittsburgh Pirates coaches
Rochester Red Wings players
San Diego Padres coaches
Sportspeople from Cedar Rapids, Iowa
Toledo Mud Hens players
Tucson Toros players